The 2022 Namibia T20 Tri-Nation Series was a Twenty20 cricket tournament that took place in Namibia in late June and early July 2022. The participating teams were the hosts Namibia, along with Jersey and United States, with the visiting teams both using the event as preparation for the 2022 ICC Men's T20 World Cup Global Qualifier B. The three associations agreed to play the matches without official Twenty20 International status.

Squads

Points table

Fixtures

Notes

References

External links
 Series home at ESPNcricinfo

Associate international cricket competitions in 2022
Namibia T20I Tri-Nation Series
Namibia T20I Tri-Nation Series